An election to Waterford City Council took place on 20 June 1985 as part of that year's Irish local elections. 15 councillors were elected from three electoral divisions by PR-STV voting for a six-year term of office.

Results by party

Results by Electoral Area

Waterford No.1

Waterford No.2

Waterford No.3

† Candidates stood under the banner of the Waterford People's Party, a localised split in the Workers' Party branch.

External links
Irishelectionliterature

1985 Irish local elections
1985